In enzymology, a 5-methyldeoxycytidine-5'-phosphate kinase is an enzyme that catalyzes the chemical reaction

ATP + 5-methyldeoxycytidine 5'-phosphate  ADP + 5-methyldeoxycytidine diphosphate

Thus, the two substrates of this enzyme are ATP and 5-methyldeoxycytidine 5'-phosphate, whereas its two products are ADP and 5-methyldeoxycytidine diphosphate.

This enzyme belongs to the family of transferases, specifically those transferring phosphorus-containing groups (phosphotransferases) with a phosphate group as acceptor.  The systematic name of this enzyme class is ATP:5-methyldeoxycytidine-5'-phosphate phosphotransferase.

References

 

EC 2.7.4
Enzymes of unknown structure